Military administration refers to the internal government of armed forces. The term may also refer to:
Military Administration (Nazi Germany), regions under German occupation in which the military exercised governmental powers
Soviet Military Administration in Germany, the immediate post-World War II administration of East Germany

See also
 British Military Administration (disambiguation)
Military rule (disambiguation)